Below is the list of the 117th Maine Senate, which was sworn into office in December 1994 and left office in December 1996. 
1 Judy Paradis (D) of St. Agatha, Aroostook County
2 Carolyne Mahany (D) of Easton, Aroostook County
3 Mike Michaud (D) of Millinocket, Penobscot County
4 Vinton Cassidy (R) of Calais, Washington County
5 Jill Goldthwait (U) of Bar Harbor, Hancock County 
6 Richard Ruhlin Sr. (D) of Brewer, Penobscot County
7 John O'Dea (D) of Orono,  Penobscot County
8 Stephen Hall (R) of Guilford, Piscataquis County
9 Sean Faircloth (D) of Bangor, Penobscot County
10 Alton Cianchette (D) of Pittsfield, Somerset County
11 Susan Longley (D) of Liberty, Waldo County
12 Chellie Pingree (D) of North Haven, Knox County
13 Peter Mills (R) of Cornville, Somerset County
14 Richard Carey (D) of Belgrade, Kennebec County
15 Beverly Bustin (D) of Hallowell, Kennebec County
16 Charles Begley (R) of Waldoboro, Lincoln County
17 John Benoit (R) of Sandy River Plantation, Franklin County
18 Dale McCormick (D) of Monmouth, Kennebec County
19 Mary Small (R) of Bath, Sagadahoc County
20 Albert Stevens (R) of Sabattus, Androscoggin County
21 Georgette Berube (D) of Lewiston, Androscoggin County
22 John Cleveland (D) of Auburn, Androscoggin County
23 Phil Harriman (R) of Yarmouth, Cumberland County
24 Norman Ferguson (R) of Hanover, Oxford County
25 Dana Hanley (R) of South Paris, Oxford County
26 Jeffrey Butland (R) of Cumberland, Cumberland County
27 Joel Abromson (R) of Portland, Cumberland County
28 Anne Rand (D) of Portland, Cumberland County
29 Donald Esty, Jr. (D) of Westbrook, Cumberland County
30 Jane Amero (R) of Cape Elizabeth, Cumberland County
31 Joan Pendexter (R) of Scarborough, Cumberland County
32 John Hathaway (R) of Kennebunkport, Cumberland County 
33 David Carpenter (R) of Springvale, York County
34 Willis Lord (R) of Waterboro, York County
35 Mark Lawrence (D) of South Berwick, York County

Maine legislative sessions
1994 in Maine
1995 in Maine
1996 in Maine
1990s in Maine